Gerard John Sier (4 June 1928 – 13 April 2006) was  a former Australian rules footballer who played with Fitzroy and Richmond in the Victorian Football League (VFL).		
		
		His brother Ken Sier also played for Fitzroy and Richmond.

Notes

External links 
		

1928 births
2006 deaths
Australian rules footballers from Victoria (Australia)
Fitzroy Football Club players
Richmond Football Club players